Thalassic is the eighth studio album by Finnish folk metal band Ensiferum. It was released on 10 July 2020 through Metal Blade Records. It is the first Ensiferum album to feature new keyboardist and clean vocalist Pekka Montin, who joined the band in February 2020.

The album's title "" (which is derived from both French and Ancient Greek) means "of or relating to seas", which pertains to the theme of the album's lyrics.

Track listing

Personnel

Band members
Petri Lindroos – harsh vocals, guitars
Markus Toivonen – guitars, acoustic guitars, backing vocals
Sami Hinkka – bass, vocals, acoustic guitars, bouzouki 
Janne Parviainen – drums, percussion
Pekka Montin – clean vocals, keyboards (except tracks 4–12 on bonus CD)

Guest members
Mikko P. Mustonen – orchestrations, whistles, guitars (additional acoustic), vocals (additional), programming 
Lassi Logrén – nyckelharpa, violin
Janne Joutsenniemi – guitars (additional), vocals (backing)
Emmi Silvennoinen – keyboards, hammond organ, grand piano, clean vocals (only tracks 4–12 on bonus CD)

Production
Janne Joutsenniemi – producer
Jens Bogren – mixing, mastering
Tero Kinnunen – additional recording
Gyula Havancsák – artwork
Vesa Ranta  – photography

Charts

References

2020 albums
Ensiferum albums